is the third Tamagotchi video game released for the Nintendo DS game system, following Tamagotchi Connection: Corner Shop 2. It was released in Japan on September 27, 2007, in North America on June 17, 2008, and in PAL regions on November 14, 2008.

Gameplay
Players can choose between Mametchi, Memetchi, Kuchipatchi, and Violetchi to become a partner, and work together to keep their customers happy. The game is similar to the previous games, the main difference being a new variety of shops. The shops have been included in the following table:

 Bakery
 Card Shop
 Day Spa
 Daycare
 Decoration Day Spa
 Decoration Shop
 Event Coordinator
 Gardening
 Treasure Hunters
 Piano Studio
 Recycling Center
 Ice Cream Parlor

The shops also expand in the same way they did before in the other Tamagotchi Connection games. Except that the Mayor is the one doing the expanding, and not the Princess, although once there can be no more expansions available the Princess does come and present you with a Royal Flag therefore making the shop the Royal Bakery, Day Care Center, etc.

Reception
Tamagotchi Connection: Corner Shop 3 debuted on the Japanese sales charts at number four, selling 54,000 units in its first week. The game managed to sell 204,744 units in the country by the end of 2007 right after Bandai and Namco Bandai Games called it "GO-GO Tamagotchi!".

References

External links
Official website 
Tamagotchi Connection: Corner Shop 3 at Namco Bandai Games

2007 video games
Bandai Namco games
Dimps games
Multiplayer and single-player video games
Nintendo DS games
Nintendo DS-only games
Tamagotchi video games
Video games based on toys
Video games developed in Australia
Video games developed in Japan